Gumpe Rime (born 12 October 1975 in Aalo, Arunachal Pradesh) is a former Indian footballer. Currently appointed as Goal Keeping Coach at Reliance Foundation Young  Champs. 

Rime started his professional career with Mahindra United and then went on to play for reputable clubs like Hindustan Aeronautics Limited S.C., Salgaocar, Vasco, and Shillong Lajong.

References

Indian footballers
1975 births
Living people
People from Along, Arunachal Pradesh
Shillong Lajong FC players
I-League players
Salgaocar FC players
Vasco SC
Mahindra United FC players
Footballers from Arunachal Pradesh
Association football goalkeepers